Drepanobandidae is a family of worms belonging to the order Polystilifera.

Genera:
 Drepanobanda Stiasny-Wijnhoff, 1936

References

Polystilifera
Nemertea families